The 2013 NRW Trophy is an international figure skating competition during the 2013–2014 season. An annual event organized in Germany by the Skating Union of North Rhine-Westphalia (NRW), it has been sanctioned by the Deutsche Eislauf Union and the International Skating Union since 2007.

Medals are awarded in the disciplines of men's singles, ladies' singles, pair skating, and ice dancing. The competition is held in Dortmund in two parts. The Ice Dance Trophy, in which ice dancers compete on the senior, junior, and novice levels, was held from 1–3 November 2013. The singles and pairs portion, also with senior, junior, and novice levels, was held from 4–8 December 2013.

Entries
The entries were as follows.

Medalists

Men

Ladies

Pairs

Ice dancing

Senior results

Men

Ladies

Pairs

Ice dancing

Junior results

Men

Ladies

Pairs

Ice dancing

Advanced Novice results

Boys

Girls

40 total competitors

Ice dancing

References

External links
 Official site of the NRW Trophy
 Results: Ice dancing, Singles and pairs

NRW Trophy
2013 in figure skating
NRW Trophy